The 2019 Virginia Tech Hokies women's soccer team represented Virginia Tech during the 2019 NCAA Division I women's soccer season. It was the 27th season of the university fielding a program and 16th competing in the Atlantic Coast Conference. The Hokies were led by 9th year head coach Charles Adair and played their home games at Thompson Field.

The Hokies finished the season 12–5–2, 4–4–2 in ACC play to finish in a tie for eight place.  They were not invited to the ACC Tournament.  They received an automatic bid to the NCAA Tournament where they lost to Xavier in the First Round.

Squad

Roster

Updated: July 8, 2020

Team management

Source:

Schedule 

Source:

|-
!colspan=7 style=""| Exhibition

|-
!colspan=7 style=""| Non-Conference Regular season

|-
!colspan=7 style=""| ACC Regular Season

|-
!colspan=7 style=""| NCAA Tournament

2020 NWSL College Draft

Source:

Rankings

References 

Virginia Tech
Virginia Tech Hokies women's soccer seasons
2019 in sports in Virginia